Škoflje is a village on the Reka River in the Municipality of Divača in the Littoral region of Slovenia.

Church

The church in Škoflje is dedicated to the Holy Cross. It is a Baroque structure that was remodeled in the 19th century. The church has a square nave and a chancel terminating in a flat wall, and there is a bell gable above the entry on the west side of the church. The church has a Baroque altar with an 1862 painting depicting the Finding of the True Cross by Pavel Künl (1817–1871).

References

External links

Škoflje on Geopedia

Populated places in the Municipality of Divača